Erzsebet Valkai (born 6 March 1979) is a Hungarian and Italian female water polo player. She competed for the Hungary women's national water polo team at the 2004 Summer Olympics. Later she switched her nationality to Italian. She was a member of the Italy women's national water polo team, playing as a centre forward at the 2008 Summer Olympics. On club level she played for Roma in Italy.

She is the sister of water polo player Ágnes Valkai, who was part of the Hungarian national team at the 2004 and 2008 Summer Olympics.

See also
 List of World Aquatics Championships medalists in water polo

References

External links
 

1979 births
Living people
Hungarian female water polo players
Italian female water polo players
Water polo players at the 2004 Summer Olympics
Water polo players at the 2008 Summer Olympics
Olympic water polo players of Italy
Olympic water polo players of Hungary